Hugh Austin Curtis (October 3, 1932 – May 27, 2014) was a sales manager and political figure in British Columbia. He represented Saanich and the Islands in the Legislative Assembly of British Columbia from 1972 to 1986 as a Progressive Conservative then Social Credit member.

Biography 
He was born in Victoria, British Columbia, the son of Austin Ivor Curtis and Helen Shepherd, and was educated there. In 1957, he married Sheila Diane Halford.

Curtis served on the municipal council for Saanich and was mayor from 1964 to 1973. He left the Progressive Conservatives to join the Social Credit party in 1974. Curtis served in the provincial cabinet as Minister of Municipal Affairs and Housing, as Provincial Secretary and Minister of Government Services, and as Minister of Finance. In 2002, he was awarded the Freeman of Saanich distinction.

He died of cancer on May 27, 2014 in a Victoria hospital.

References 

1932 births
2014 deaths
British Columbia Conservative Party MLAs
British Columbia Social Credit Party MLAs
Deaths from cancer in British Columbia
Finance ministers of British Columbia
Mayors of places in British Columbia
Members of the Executive Council of British Columbia
Politicians from Victoria, British Columbia